Babylon no Kiseki (バビロンの奇跡 / Miracle of Babylon) is the second single by Japanese recording artist LISA since her split from m-flo, and sixth overall single. It ranked at #31 on the Oricon charts and stayed on the charts for one month. It became the ending theme song for the television show Future Tracks.

Background information
Babylon no Kiseki is the second single by Japanese R&B soloist LISA under the Avex sub-label Rhythm Zone since splitting from the hip-hop duo m-flo. The single peaked at #31 on Oricon, but took the #36 spot on the Weekly Singles Charts, remaining on the charts for four consecutive weeks.

The single was only released as a CD. Although it was given a music video for the single's promotional run, the video would not be released for purchase until her 2005 cover album Melody Circus. The title track was composed by Tokyo Ska Paradise Orchestra, a ska/jazz band created in 1988.

LISA wrote the lyrics to "Babylon no Kiseki" to reflect how the society in Japan was at the time. During an interview for the single, LISA said how "You look at the world right now and there’s war and recession . . . suicide and homeless people.” However, LISA said how the song was also optimistic of what was the come, how people "are alive at this stage for a reason" and that each person "is a miracle . . . even if your situation is Babylon."

Promotional activities
"Babylon no Kiseki" was used as the end theme for the TV Asahi show Future Tracks. It was also used as the promotional song for Kirin's "Hyōketsu Kajū" beer and for the karaoke company Daiichikosho.

None of the single's b-sides were used as promotional tracks.

Track listing

Release history

References

External links
LISA Official Discography Web Site
 HMV Album Release

2002 singles
2002 songs
Rhythm Zone singles
Songs written by Lisa (Japanese musician, born 1974)